The Columbia Basin Railroad (CBRR) is a common freight carrier that operates between Moses Lake and Connell in the state of Washington, USA.

Route
The CBRR connects the Washington communities of Moses Lake, Wheeler, Schrag, Warden, Othello and Connell.

History
The Columbia Basin Railroad was established in 1986 as part of the Washington Central Railroad Company, which bought  of railway in Central Washington from Burlington Northern. The company, owned by Eric Temple, also owned the Spirit of Washington Dinner Train operating in King County, Washington.

Traffic
According to Railway Age, the CBRR was the busiest shortline railroad in eastern Washington in 2014, with over 10,000 carloads annually of agricultural and industrial shipments.

References

See also
 List of Washington railroads

1986 establishments in Washington (state)
Rail transportation in Washington (state)